Safrazine (Safra) is a non-selective, irreversible monoamine oxidase inhibitor (MAOI) of the hydrazine class that was introduced as an antidepressant in the 1960s, but has since been discontinued.

See also 
 Hydrazine (antidepressant)

References 

Hydrazines
Monoamine oxidase inhibitors
Benzodioxoles
Withdrawn drugs